The Municipality of Ivančna Gorica is a municipality in the traditional region of Lower Carniola in central Slovenia. The seat of the municipality is the town of Ivančna Gorica. Ivančna Gorica became a municipality in 1995.

Settlements
In addition to the municipal seat of Ivančna Gorica, the municipality also includes the following settlements:

 Ambrus
 Artiža Vas
 Bakrc
 Boga Vas
 Bojanji Vrh
 Bratnice
 Breg pri Dobu
 Breg pri Temenici
 Breg pri Zagradcu
 Brezovi Dol
 Bukovica
 Čagošče
 Češnjice pri Zagradcu
 Debeče
 Dečja Vas pri Zagradcu
 Dedni Dol
 Dob pri Šentvidu
 Dobrava pri Stični
 Dolenja Vas pri Temenici
 Fužina
 Gabrje pri Stični
 Gabrovčec
 Gabrovka pri Zagradcu
 Glogovica
 Gorenja Vas
 Gorenje Brezovo
 Gradiček
 Grintovec
 Griže
 Grm
 Hrastov Dol
 Kal
 Kamni Vrh pri Ambrusu
 Kamno Brdo
 Kitni Vrh
 Kriška Vas
 Krka
 Krška Vas
 Kuželjevec
 Laze nad Krko
 Leščevje
 Leskovec
 Lučarjev Kal
 Mala Dobrava
 Mala Goričica
 Male Češnjice
 Male Dole pri Temenici
 Male Kompolje
 Male Lese
 Male Pece
 Male Rebrce
 Male Vrhe
 Mali Kal
 Mali Korinj
 Malo Črnelo
 Malo Globoko
 Malo Hudo
 Marinča Vas
 Mekinje nad Stično
 Metnaj
 Mevce
 Mleščevo
 Mrzlo Polje
 Muljava
 Nova Vas
 Obolno
 Oslica
 Osredek nad Stično
 Petrušnja Vas
 Peščenik
 Planina
 Podboršt
 Podbukovje
 Podsmreka pri Višnji Gori
 Pokojnica
 Poljane pri Stični
 Polje pri Višnji Gori
 Potok pri Muljavi
 Praproče pri Temenici
 Primča Vas
 Pristava nad Stično
 Pristava pri Višnji Gori
 Pristavlja Vas
 Pungert
 Pusti Javor
 Radanja Vas
 Radohova Vas
 Ravni Dol
 Rdeči Kal
 Sad
 Sela pri Dobu
 Sela pri Sobračah
 Sela pri Višnji Gori
 Selo pri Radohovi Vasi
 Šentjurje
 Šentpavel na Dolenjskem
 Šentvid pri Stični
 Škoflje
 Škrjanče
 Sobrače
 Spodnja Draga
 Spodnje Brezovo
 Stari Trg
 Stična
 Stranska Vas ob Višnjici
 Sušica
 Temenica
 Tolčane
 Trebež
 Trebnja Gorica
 Trnovica
 Valična Vas
 Velika Dobrava
 Velike Češnjice
 Velike Dole pri Temenici
 Velike Kompolje
 Velike Lese
 Velike Pece
 Velike Rebrce
 Velike Vrhe
 Veliki Kal
 Veliki Korinj
 Veliko Črnelo
 Veliko Globoko
 Videm pri Temenici
 Vir pri Stični
 Višnja Gora
 Višnje
 Vrh pri Sobračah
 Vrh pri Višnji Gori
 Vrhpolje pri Šentvidu
 Zaboršt pri Šentvidu
 Zagradec
 Zavrtače
 Zgornja Draga
 Znojile pri Krki

References

External links

Municipality of Ivančna Gorica on Geopedia
Ivančna Gorica municipal site

 
Ivančna Gorica
1995 establishments in Slovenia